Apollosa is a comune (municipality) in the Province of Benevento in the Italian region Campania, located about 50 km northeast of Naples and about 8 km southwest of Benevento.

Apollosa borders the following municipalities: Benevento, Campoli del Monte Taburno, Castelpoto, Ceppaloni, Montesarchio, San Leucio del Sannio.

References

Cities and towns in Campania